Awakening for Latvia is a conservative political party in Latvia. It was founded as For Latvia from the Heart in May 2014 by former State Auditor Inguna Sudraba.

History
The party was established on 5 May 2014 by Inguna Sudraba, a former State Auditor.

Although Sudraba had a clean image amongst the Latvian public, the 2014 election campaign saw her being filmed having lunch with an oligarch. In addition, she has refused to fully answer questions about the party's funding. The party campaigned on a general platform of fair wages and pensions, as well as increasing the accountability of government. In the parliamentary elections in October 2014 the party passed the electoral threshold, ensuring representation in the Saeima.

In January 2018, the party faction was removed from Saeima lists due to not having the minimal amount of MPs needed for a parliamentary group, following member Ringolds Balodis’ withdrawal from For Latvia from the Heart. Later, on March 13, the party joined the SKG Alliance.

The new party is now the leader of the reformed SKG Alliance, now renamed Awakening, together with the Christian Democratic Union.

Sudraba left the board of the alliance (and, apparently, the party) in March 2020. She was replaced by former Baldone Municipality Chair Andrejs Požarnovs and Christian Democratic Union board chairman Mareks Raups.

The Awakening alliance has not participated in any elections since 2019.

Election results

Saeima

Symbols and logos

References

External links
Official website 

Political parties in Latvia
Conservative parties in Latvia
Conservative parties
Political parties established in 2014
Social conservative parties
2014 establishments in Latvia
European Christian Political Movement